Renault Pars (Renou Pars) is an Iranian joint venture established in 2004 and owned by Renault and Iran's Industrial Development Renovation Organisation (IDRO) . The company is in charge of managing the assembly of CKD Renault cars by local manufacturers Iran Khodro and SAIPA's Pars Khodro.

History
Renault cars were manufactured in Iran as early as December 1976, when a local company started the production of the Renault 5. However, several restrictions made difficult for Renault to manufacture locally. The restrictions were reduced in the 1990s and Iran SAIPA produced various Renault cars, including the 5 and the 21.

On 24 March 2004, Renault, IDRO and the Presidents of Iran Khodro and SAIPA signed the agreement which established Renault Pars. The company organises the assembly of imported CKD cars, but the engines are produced locally.

By 2018, Renault had left the Iranian market but its cars were still being made by its local partners. By 2020 SAIPA (Pars Khodro's parent) was making a updated version of the original Dacia Logan called the SAIPA Renault Pars Tondar with over 85% of local parts, according to company CEO Javad Soleimani.

Cars manufactured
Renault L90 (2004–2019)
Renault Pars Tondar (2012–2019) - also known as the SAIPA Renault Pars Tondar
Renault Sandero (2015–2020)
Renault Sandero Stepway (2016–2020)

References

External links
 

Renault
Vehicle manufacturing companies established in 2004
Car manufacturers of Iran
Manufacturing companies based in Tehran
2004 establishments in Iran